The following is a list of Luxembourgish exonyms, that is to say Luxembourgish-language names for places that do not speak Luxembourgish.

Belgium

France

Germany

Greece

Italy

See also
List of European exonyms

Lists of exonyms
Luxembourgish language